Andrea Irmgard Thomas, née Bersch (born 9 April 1963 in Güls) is a retired German sprinter who specialized in the 200 metres. At the 1987 World Championships in Athletics in Rome she finished fifth in 4x100 m relay for West Germany. At the 1988 Summer Olympics in Seoul she finished fourth in 4x100 m relay and 4x400 m relay. At the 1990 European Championships in Athletics in Split she won a silver medal in 4x100 m relay for West Germany together with Gabi Lippe, Ulrike Sarvari and Silke Knoll. In addition she finished eighth in 200 metres and fourth in 4x400 m relay.

International competitions

References

1963 births
Living people
West German female sprinters
German female sprinters
Athletes (track and field) at the 1988 Summer Olympics
Athletes (track and field) at the 1992 Summer Olympics
Olympic athletes of West Germany
Olympic athletes of Germany
European Athletics Championships medalists
Sportspeople from Koblenz
World Athletics Championships athletes for West Germany
Olympic female sprinters